Mani Sapol (born 5 June 1991) is a Togolese football midfielder currently playing for Dynamic Togolais.

Career

Club
In 2007 Sapol was voted by the English magazine World Soccer as the 30th "Most Exciting Teen Footballer" in 2007.

Sapol began his career in the youth from Maranatha FC, before in 2007 transferred to Maranatha F.C., a Fiokpo based club, there he played for two years before being sold to Al-Ittihad from Tripoli. The Togolese young prodigy is currently overseen by PSG and Monaco, the club Ittihad have already rejected initials offers from both French teams.

On 3 January 2010 Sapol scored the winner in a 1–0 victory over Al-Ahli Tripoli, Al-Ittihad's major rivals in the Libyan Premier League.
On 2 January 2012 Sapol signed for Algerian club CA Batna. On 28 January 2012 he made his debut for the club as a starter in a league game against MC Saïda.

In April 2015, after nearly two years without a club, Sapol signed for FC Dacia Chișinău in the Moldovan National Division, on a two-year contract taking affect from May 2015.

He returned to Togo in the summer 2017, signing for Dynamic Togolais. He was selected as player of the month of the Togolese Championnat National in December 2017.

International
International A at only 16 years, he participated in a tournament with players such Adébayor, Essien and Muntari. He is a genius of dribbling and passing. He played FIFA U17 Worldcup in Korea in 2007.

Sapol announced his arrival in Korea with a sharp turn and stunning drive into the bottom corner in Togo's opener against Costa Rica. This industrious midfielder can make as well as score goals; he gets from box to box, and is as happy breaking up play as he is good at initiating it. Sapol had a magnificent tournament. He has played his first game for the Les Eperviers on 11 October 2008 against Swaziland.

Sapol was a victim of a serious car accident on 14 November 2009 in Togo.

Personal life
Sapol is the brother of the footballer Mani Ougadja.

Career statistics

International

Statistics accurate as of match played 14 June 2013

International goals

Honours

Club
Al-Ittihad SCSC
Libyan Premier League (3): 2007–08, 2008–09, 2009–10
Libyan Cup (1): 2009
Libyan League Cup (1): 2008–09
Libyan Super Cup (3): 2007, 2008, 2009, 2010

Individual
 Togolese Young Player of the Year 2007
 Libyan Premier League Young Player of The Year 2007-08

References

External links 
Mani Sapol official Blog

1991 births
Sportspeople from Lomé
Living people
Togolese footballers
Association football forwards
Togo youth international footballers
Togo international footballers
Maranatha FC players
Al-Ittihad Club (Tripoli) players
CA Batna players
FC Dacia Chișinău players
Dynamic Togolais players
Algerian Ligue Professionnelle 1 players
Moldovan Super Liga players
Togolese expatriate footballers
Expatriate footballers in Libya
Expatriate footballers in Algeria
Expatriate footballers in Moldova
Togolese expatriate sportspeople in Libya
Togolese expatriate sportspeople in Moldova
2010 Africa Cup of Nations players
2013 Africa Cup of Nations players
Libyan Premier League players
21st-century Togolese people